Central Board of Secondary Education expression series is an online/offline essay/poem/drawing competition organised by the Central Board of Secondary Education (CBSE) in India for classes 1 to 12. It was initiated in 2014. A cash prize of Indian Rupees 2500-25,000 is given to each of the 36 winners (12 in each category)  In 2014, more than 29,000 students participated. Entries are accepted in any of 22 scheduled languages and in English. The purpose of the contest is to make students aware of the history of women and men who have served the nation of India.

Topics

2014

2015 
It focused on the contribution of great leaders of India and on several important issues related to women, society (both rural and urban) and the nation.

Selection of winners 
The final winners are selected from three class categories, i.e. classes 1st to 5th, Classes 6th to 8th and classes 9th to 12th. Winning entries are compiled in an E- book.

References

Central Board of Secondary Education
Competitions in India